Fanling (also spelled Fan Ling or Fan Leng) is a town in the New Territories East of Hong Kong. Administratively, it is part of the North District. Fanling Town is the main settlement of the Fanling area. The name Fanling is a shortened form of Fan Pik Leng. The area has several public and private estates.

Northwest of Fanling is Sheung Shui and southeast is Tai Po.

Areas
Part of Fanling–Sheung Shui New Town, Fanling Town includes Luen Wo Hui, the marketplace of Fanling before urban development in the area, and Wo Hop Shek, where an uphill public cemetery is located.

Fanling North is one of three new development areas currently being planned for North District, in parallel with Ta Kwu Ling and Kwu Tung North.

Sights
 Fanling Wai, a walled village.
 Fung Ying Seen Koon, a Taoist temple.
 Lung Yeuk Tau Heritage Trail
 Tao Heung Foods of Mankind Museum (relocated to Fo Tan in 2008)

Housing estates

Public and private housing estates in Fanling include:
 Avon Park
 Belair Monte
 Cheung Wah Estate
 Dawning Views
 Fanling Centre
 Fanling Town Centre
 Flora Plaza
 Grand Regentville
 Regentville
 Ka Fuk Estate
 Ka Shing Court
 King Shing Court
 Wah Ming Estate
 Wah Sum Estate
 Yan Shing Court
 Yung Shing Court
 Greenpark Villa
 Cheerful Park
 Vienna Garden
 Wing Fok Centre
 Wing Fai Centre
 Wah Ming Estate
 Union Plaza

Villages
Villages in the Fanling area include:

 Fan Leng Lau
 Fanling Wai
 Fu Tei Pai
 Hok Tau Wai
 Hung Leng
 Kan Tau Tsuen
 Ko Po
 Kwai Tau Leng
 Kwan Tei
 Lau Shui Heung
 Leng Pei Tsuen
 Leng Tsai
 Lung Yeuk Tau (including San Uk Tsuen, San Wai, Wing Ning Tsuen, Wing Ning Wai, Ma Wat Tsuen, Tung Kok Wai and Lo Wai)
 Ma Liu Shui San Tsuen
 Ma Mei Ha
 Ma Mei Ha, Leng Tsui
 Ma Liu Shui San Tsuen
 Ma Wat Tsuen
 Ma Wat Wai
 On Lok Tsuen
 San Tong Po
 San Uk Tsai
 Shung Him Tong Tsuen
 Tong Hang
 Siu Hang San Tsuen
 Siu Hang Tsuen
 Sze Tau Leng
 Tan Chuk Hang
 Tsz Tong Tsuen
 Wa Mei Shan
 Wo Hop Shek

Education
Fanling is in Primary One Admission (POA) School Net 81. Within the school net are multiple aided schools (operated independently but funded with government money); no government schools are in the net.

Schools in Fanling:
 Fanling Public School (aided school)

Transport
Fanling is served by:
 Route 9
 Fanling station in Fanling Town
 Bus routes

References

External links

 Fanling Babies Home - Hong Kong orphanage - Children's Home
 Orthophoto of Fanling in Google Map
 About Lung Yeuk Tau (in Chinese only)